Vladyslav Omelchenko (born 24 September 1975) is a Ukrainian professional darts player who currently plays in the Professional Darts Corporation (PDC) and other national events. He became the first player from Ukraine who qualified for the PDC World Darts Championship. He represented his country during the WDF World Cup and WDF Europe Cup. In the past, he worked as a miner.

Career
Omelchenko made his international debut at the 2018 WDF Europe Cup. In the singles competition, he only played one game in the first round, where he lost to Andy Bless by 2–4 in legs. In the team competition, Ukraine was eliminated in the group stage, finishing fourth out of five. In 2019, Vladyslav took part in the second edition of Ukraine Open and Kiev Masters. In the second tournament he reached the quarter-finals.

A month later, he represented Ukraine at the 2019 WDF World Cup. In the individual competition, he reached the third round, defeating on his way Marjan Sket and Wesley Daries. In the third round, he slightly lost to Andreas Harrysson by 3–4 in legs. In the team competition, the Ukrainians surprisingly left the group by defeating Germany. In the second round they were defeated by the Slovak national team.

In the following years, his career development was slowed down by the coronavirus pandemic. Due to the situation related to 2022 Russian invasion of Ukraine, he took part in the first ever qualification for the PDC World Darts Championship for players from Ukraine. He won his way through to the quarter-finals, where he beat Artem Usyk by 6–3 in legs. In the semi-finals he defeated Yaroslav Mykytyn by 6–4 in legs, and in the final he defeated Volodymyr Zalevskyi 3–0 in sets, qualified for the 2023 PDC World Darts Championship for the first time.

World Championship results

PDC
 2023: First round (lost to Luke Woodhouse 0–3)

Performance timeline

References

1975 births
Living people
Sportspeople from Kryvyi Rih
Ukrainian darts players
Ukrainian coal miners
Professional Darts Corporation associate players
21st-century Ukrainian people